Fürstenberg-Baar was a County of medieval Germany, located in southern Baden-Württemberg in the territory of Baar. It was created as a partition of Fürstenberg-Fürstenberg in 1441. It inherited the County of Fürstenberg-Geisingen in 1483, and Fürstenberg-Wolfach in 1490. It was partitioned between Fürstenberg-Blumberg and Fürstenberg-Heiligenberg in 1559.

Counts of Fürstenberg-Baar (1441 - 1559)
Conrad V (1441 - 1484)
Henry IX (1484 - 1499)
Wolfgang (1499 - 1509)
Frederick III (1509 - 1559)

Fürstenberg (princely family)
Counties of the Holy Roman Empire
States and territories established in 1441